Matic Rebec (born January 24, 1995) is a Slovenian professional basketball player for Cedevita Olimpija of the Slovenian League and the ABA League. Standing at 1.80 m, he plays at the point guard position.

Rebec spent the 2019-20 season with Cibona and Rasta Vechta. On August 19, 2020, he signed with Rouen Métropole Basket of the LNB Pro B. Rebec signed with Basket Ravenna in 2021 and averaged 11.2 points, 4.2 rebounds, 5.7 assists and 1.1 steals per game. On September 30, he signed with Chieti Basket 1974. Rebec averaged 6.1 points, 3.3 assists, and 2.4 rebounds per game. On December 22, he signed with Agribertocchi Orzinuovi.

References

External links
Fiba.com profile
Profile at ABA League

1995 births
Living people
ABA League players
BC Enisey players
FIBA EuroBasket-winning players
Gipuzkoa Basket players
KK FMP players
KK Krka players
Liga ACB players
People from Postojna
Point guards
Slovenian expatriate basketball people in Croatia
Slovenian expatriate basketball people in Italy
Slovenian expatriate basketball people in Serbia
Slovenian expatriate basketball people in Spain
Slovenian men's basketball players
KK Cibona players